Magnant can refer to:

 Magnant, Aube, commune in the Aube department in north-central France.
 Magnant (video game), an RTS  game by American studio Mohydine Entertainment